UGC 9128 is a dwarf irregular galaxy around 6.8–7.8 Mly (2.1–2.4 Mpc) away; it is thought to be in the Local Group, although its membership is not certain. It is therefore quite faint, and so was only discovered in the 20th century.

UGC 9128 is around 2.7 Mly from GR 8, which is its nearest neighbour.

UGC 9128 is a starburst galaxy, with the peak of star formation being 20–100 million years ago. It is thought to have both a halo and disc.

References 

Dwarf irregular galaxies
Boötes
UGC objects